Operation Chicago Peak was a joint U.S. Army and Army of the Republic of Vietnam (ARVN) military operation during the Vietnam War designed to keep pressure on the People's Army of Vietnam (PAVN) units in the A Sầu Valley and prevent them from mounting any attacks on the neighboring coastal provinces.

Background
The A Sầu Valley was an important corridor for the PAVN and Viet Cong (VC), who used it to transport supplies from Laos into South Vietnam as well as a staging area for attacks. Previous sweeps of the valley in Operation Delaware (19 April – 17 May 1968), Operation Dewey Canyon (22 January – 18 March 1969), Operation Massachusetts Striker (28 February - 8 May 1969) and Operation Apache Snow (10 May - 7 June 1969) in the preceding years had temporarily disrupted PAVN operations, but were unsuccessful at removing the PAVN/VC from the valley.

The operation was scheduled to commence with the end of the monsoon and U.S. forces launched Operation Texas Star on 1 April to establish firebases to support the operation. However the Battle of Fire Support Base Ripcord and the engagement of PAVN forces on the Khe Sanh plateau in Operation Clinch Valley forced the postponement and scaling back of the operation. One of the objectives of the operation, the Co Pung Mountain area, 4km northeast of the A Sầu was found to be heavily defended by PAVN with 11 helicopters damaged by anti-aircraft fire and the acting commander of the 101st Airborne Division, Brigadier general Sidney Bryan Berry, was instructed to avoid heavy U.S. casualties.

Operation
The scaled-back operation was finally launch on 25 July with the 2nd Battalion, 502nd Infantry Regiment landed to reopen Firebase Maureen east of Co Pung Mountain On 30 July with artillery support from Firebase Maureen, the ARVN 3rd Regiment, 1st Infantry Division was landed on Co Pung Mountain. After some initial fighting, the PAVN withdrew from the mountain.

On 6 August the PAVN 6th Regiment attacked the ARVN 1st Regiment's Firebase O'Reilly 8km north of Ripcord. 1st Division commander General Ngô Quang Trưởng reinforced O'Reilly with another Regiment and the ARVN defended the base for two months before abandoning it in early October.

On 12 August, 101st Airborne commander Major general John J. Hennessey terminated the operation to allow the ARVN to concentrate on defending Firebase O’Reilly. It was speculated that the PAVN attacks around O'Reilly were to divert allied attention from the logistical activity along the border and in Laos or the PAVN were attempting to draw allied forces out of the populated lowlands to provide greater freedom of movement for VC forces in a continuing assault on the pacification and Vietnamization programs.

Aftermath
PAVN losses were 97 killed and ARVN losses were 3 killed, there were no U.S. killed.

References

1970 in Vietnam
Battles involving Vietnam
Battles and operations of the Vietnam War
Battles involving the United States
Battles and operations of the Vietnam War in 1970
History of Thừa Thiên Huế province